Habeeb Mohamed Mohamed Harees (ஹபீப் முஹம்மட் முஹம்மட் ஹரீஸ்) is a Sri Lankan politician and Member of Parliament.

Harees represented the Ampara multi-member electoral district for the Sri Lanka Muslim Congress in the Sri Lankan Parliament between December 2001 and April 2004.

Harees returned to Parliament in April 2010, this time representing Ampara for the United National Front.

References
 

Sri Lanka Muslim Congress politicians
Samagi Jana Balawegaya politicians
Members of the 12th Parliament of Sri Lanka
Members of the 14th Parliament of Sri Lanka
Members of the 15th Parliament of Sri Lanka
Members of the 16th Parliament of Sri Lanka
1971 births
Living people
People from Dehiwala-Mount Lavinia